Wilbert Gabriel Delainey (July 26, 1922 – November 13, 2000) was a Canadian ice hockey player with the Edmonton Mercurys. He won a gold medal at the 1950 World Ice Hockey Championships in London, England. The 1950 Edmonton Mercurys team was inducted to the Alberta Sports Hall of Fame in 2011. He previously played with the Edmonton Maple Leafs and Camrose Maroons.

References

1922 births
Year of death missing
Canadian ice hockey goaltenders
Ice hockey people from Saskatchewan
People from Rural Municipality Buffalo No. 409, Saskatchewan